The Personal Urban Mobility and Accessibility (PUMA) was an experimental electrically powered road vehicle created by Segway and adopted by General Motors as a concept vehicle representing the future of urban transportation.  It operates on two wheels placed side by side, a layout that differs in placement from motorcycles which instead have their two wheels placed at the front and rear.  

Segway's CEO and President, James D. Norrod claimed that the use of General Motors' sales network worldwide could allow for PUMA sales to exceed the number of Segway PT models sold to date.

By 2016, Segway no longer shared information about the PUMA project at Segway.com. However, it featured the PUMA at its new Chinese flagship store , which opened in Beijing in August 2016.

Prototype
The first public prototype was demonstrated in April 2009, being formally announced by Segway and General Motors in advance of its display at the New York International Auto Show.

Safety
One idea proposed is that the vehicle would make use of its Global Positioning System (GPS) determined position to avoid crashes with other vehicles; the position would be transmitted to other vehicles using a communications technology.  With all of the vehicles knowing their whereabouts, it would allow each car to drive itself to avoid obstacles including other vehicles and pedestrians. The developers claim that crash-avoidance systems would eliminate the need for airbags and would include seat belts exclusively for "comfort purposes".

Initial uses might include college campuses and other locations where traditional passenger cars and trucks are limited.

Technology
The vehicle uses Segway's dynamic stabilization technology to maintain balance across two parallel wheels while driving.  In addition to the main driving wheels at each side of the vehicle, there are small stabilizing wheels at both front and rear to support the vehicle whilst parked and to limit the maximum leaning angle.

See also
General Motors EN-V
BMW Mega City Vehicle
VisLab, and their VIAC intercontinental challenge (driving from Italy to China with autonomous vehicles)
Google driverless car
MIT Media Lab CityCar

References

External links
P.U.M.A. – Segway Advanced Development

Electric concept cars
General Motors vehicles
Electric city cars